George Pack may refer to:

 George Pack (actor), (died 1724), British stage actor
 George Pack Jr. (1794–1875), businessman, landowner, sawmill operator, and postmaster on the Lower Peninsula of Michigan
 George Willis Pack (1831–1906), timberman on Michigan's Lower Peninsula
 George T. Pack (1898–1969), American oncologist